He Cheng (November 1901 – November 8, 1992) birth name He Zonglin, was a People's Liberation Army lieutenant general. He was born in Santai, Sichuan Province. He joined the Communist Party of China in 1925. He participated in the Northern Expedition and the Guangzhou Uprising.

1901 births
1992 deaths
People's Liberation Army generals from Sichuan